Alexander Weissberg-Cybulski (born October 8, 1901  – April 4, 1964) was a Polish-Austrian physicist, writer and businessman of Jewish descent. His testimony in the trial David Rousset vs. Les Lettres francaises and his book The Accused contributed significantly to spreading knowledge about Stalinist terror and show trials in Western Europe.

Biography
Weissberg was born in 1901 in Kraków, to a Jewish family. His father was a businessman. The family moved to Vienna, where Weissberg studied and worked as a physicist. 

Weissberg emigrated to the Soviet Union in 1931 to work as a physicist. He founded the Soviet Journal of Physics. In doing so he came to know Bukharin. It was this relationship with Bukharin that was later to become central to the regime's attempt to frame Weissberg as part of a conspiracy to assassinate Stalin. He was imprisoned for four years in the Soviet Union.

Weissberg was handed over to the Gestapo by Stalin as part of the prisoner exchange in the Nazi–Soviet pact (also known as the Molotov–Ribbentrop Pact) in 1939. Koestler's preface explains how the advocacy of fellow physicist Albert Einstein was instrumental in securing the Nazi release of Weissberg. 

During World War II he changed his surname to Weissberg-Cybulski, taking the name of Graf Cybulski, his wife's first husband.

He died on April 4, 1964; his place of death is stated as either Paris or London.

Writings

The Accused or Conspiracy of Silence
His book The Accused (1951) is also published under the title Conspiracy of Silence (Hamish Hamilton, London, 1952). The preface is by Weissberg's friend Arthur Koestler (awarded the Sonning Prize in 1968 for contribution to European culture). The book also included copies of letters which Einstein and Joliot-Curie sent to Stalin, requesting his release. 

The book is both a personal narrative and forensic analysis of the methods employed by Stalin and the G.P.U. during the Great Purge from the middle of 1936 to the end of 1938. It is the exploration of the systematic imprisonment, interrogation and extraction of false confessions from millions of people that is extraordinary. Weissberg explains how victims of the state police were forced to make confessions incriminating not only themselves but also co-conspirators. This practice was aimed at destroying the relations of trust between those who were responsible for the Russian revolution. Those who were not killed in camps in the Soviet Arctic were divided and conquered. The central thesis in the book is that the Russian revolution and communism in the Soviet Union were irrevocably destroyed and ended in the 1930s during the terror of the Stalinist purges.

Advocate for the Dead
Weissberg also wrote a book titled Advocate for the Dead (Andre Deutsch, 1959). This book tells the story of Joel Brand and examines the working of the Jewish underground movement in Hungary and other places during the Second World War.

References

1901 births
1964 deaths
20th-century Polish physicists
Soviet physicists
Polish male writers
20th-century Polish Jews
Scientists from Kraków
Jewish physicists
People associated with the magazine "Kultura"